Posterior ethmoidal may refer to:

 Posterior ethmoidal artery, an artery of the head which supplies the nasal septum
 Posterior ethmoidal foramen
 Posterior ethmoidal nerve, a branch of the nasociliary nerve
 Ethmoidal veins, the venae comitantes of the ethmoidal arteries